The following outline is provided as an overview of and topical guide to mining:

Mining – extraction of valuable minerals or other geological materials from the earth, usually (but not always) from an ore body, vein or (coal) seam. Any material that cannot be grown from agricultural processes, or created artificially in a laboratory or factory, is usually mined.

Basic Concepts 

Mining engineering
Resource extraction

Geology of mining

Basic terms
 Mineral
 Rock (geology), an aggregate material usually made up of a number of minerals
 Ore, rock containing a desired mineral
 Ore genesis, the geological processes by which ore is formed and deposited
 Ore grade, the amount of a desired mineral or metal that a quantity of ore contains
high grade ores are rich in the mineral desired, low-grade ores have less of the mineral desired
 Gangue, minerals within the ore that are not desired; these are removed during ore processing
Vein (geology) a geological formation that often contains ore
 Overburden, the material on top of a given mineral deposit (in surface mining, it has to be removed)

Finding ore
Prospecting
Mineral exploration

Materials mined 
Some examples of materials that are extracted from the earth by mining include:
 Base metals
 Bauxite (Aluminium)
 Cassiterite (Tin)
 Chromite (Chromium)
 Cinnabar (Mercury)
 Cobaltite (Cobalt)
 Coltan (Niobium and Tantalum)
 Columbite (Niobium)
 Copper – see List of copper ores
 Ilmenite (Titanium)
 Iron ore (Iron)
 Galena (Lead)
 Magnesite (Magnesium)
 Malachite (Copper)
 Molybdenite (Molybdenum)
 Pentlandite (Nickel)
 Pyrolusite (Manganese)
 Scheelite (Tungsten)
 Sphalerite (Zinc)
 Tantalite (Tantalum)
 Tin
 Wolframite (Tungsten)
 Baryte (Barium)
 Beryl (Beryllium and Gemstones)
 Clay
 Construction aggregates
 Gravel – see Gravel pit
 Sand – see Sand mining
 Diamonds
 dolomite (ornamental stone, Magnesium)
 Fossil fuels
 Coal – see Coal mining
 Oil sands
 Oil shale – see Oil shale industry and Shale oil extraction
 Gemstones
 Kaolinite
 Limestone
 Phosphorite (Phosphate)
 Precious metals
 Gold – see Gold mining
 Silver – see Silver mining
 Platinum
 Potash
 Rare-earth elements
 Slate – see Slate industry
 Rock salt
 Stone – see Quarry
 List of decorative stones
 Sulfur
 Uranium ore

Types of mining and techniques

Surface mining
Surface mining, mining conducted down into the ground, but with the sky open above
 Open-pit mining, where the overburden is removed and put in a different location, leaving a large pit at the end.
 Strip mining, where the overburden is stripped off and placed onto the area where the mineral (usually coal) has already been mined out, allowing the surface to be returned to roughly how it was before
 Mountaintop removal mining, where the overburden on a mountain is pushed off the mountain into the adjacent valley
 Quarrying
 Placer mining
 Dredging
 Hydraulic mining, using high-pressure jets of water to blast soil or hillsides apart

Underground mining
Sub-surface mining, mining conducted underground
Two main types of underground mining, classified by the characteristic of the rock being mined:
Underground mining (hard rock)
Underground mining (soft rock)
There are three directions by which an underground mine may be conducted:
 Drift mining, mining horizontally
 Shaft mining, mining vertically
 Slope mining, mining at an inclined angle
Stoping is the process of extracting out the ore from underground, leaving a hole called a stope
 Room and pillar
 Longwall mining
 Retreat mining
 Fire-setting, a method used in stoping by setting fires to timber and letting the resulting collapse break up the rock

Other methods
 Borehole mining
 Box cut
 Deepsea mining
 Glory hole (petroleum production)
 Heap leaching
 In-situ leach
 Landfill mining
 Mine reclamation
 Omega Hydraulic Diggings
 Quartz reef mining

Mining equipment

Excavation

Heavy machinery
 Steam shovel, used from the 19th century to the 1930s
 Power shovel, derived from the steam shovel, but using electricity instead of steam
 Excavator, derived from the steam shovel, but using hydraulics or pneumatics instead of steam
 Draglines use buckets attached to long cable lines, rather than affixed to a beam
 Bucket-wheel excavator, the largest moving land machines ever built
 Dredge

Blasting

Rock blasting
Explosives
Gunpowder or black powder, used from the 17th century to the mid-19th century
Dynamite, used from the mid-19th century into the 20th century, still used some today
ANFO, used from the 20th century, and the primary explosive in use today
Blasting gear
Detonator, a small explosive charge used to set off the main explosive
Blasting machine, a device used to generate or send an electric charge to the detonators

Transport

Vertical equipment
 Hoist (mining)
 Winding engine
 Headframe
Equipment for transporting miners
 Man engine
 Mantrip

Engines used in mining
 Archimedes' screw
 Beam engine
 Drilling rig
 Loader (equipment)
 Wheel tractor-scraper

Liquid mining
 Pumpjack
 Wellhead
 Subsea

Safety and environment
 Safety lamp
 Miner's canary
 Air classifier
 Movement and Surveying Radar

Processing
Ore dressing
General methods of ore processing
Froth flotation
Trommel
Methods peculiar to gold placer mining. Gold is much denser than many other minerals, various methods use this to separate it out:
Gold panning, uses a pan in water to wash material
Rocker box
Sluice box
Drywasher, used where there is insuffician
Extractive metallurgy
Pyrometallurgy, using heat
Smelting
Cupellation
Hydrometallurgy, using aqueous solutions
Leaching, using an acid (lixiviant) to remove. Commonly used for gold and copper
Amalgamation, using liquid mercury to extract the metal. Used to separate out silver and gold.
Electrometallurgy, using electricity to separate out metals

Mining waste
 Spoil tip, a pile where overburden is placed (which has NOT been processed)
 Tailings, waste mineral material (gangue) leftover AFTER processing 
 Slag, material left over from smelting
 Acid mine drainage, liquid leached out of mines

Mining hazards and safety 
 Bootleg mining
 Claustrophobia
 Deformation monitoring
 Coal mining debate
 Damp (mining)
 After damp
 Black damp
 Fire damp
 Stink damp
 White damp
 Energy law
 Mine disaster
 Mine exploration
 Mine fire
 Mine rescue
 Mining accident
 Mining induced subsidence

Geography of mining 

List of diamond mines
List of uranium mines

Mining, by country

Mining of specific minerals, by country 

 Bentonite production, by country
 Bismuth production, by country
 Feldspar production, by country
 Fluorite production, by country
 Manganese production, by country
 Mine production of gold, by country
 Uranium production, by country

History of mining 

 Cornish stamps
 Davy lamp
 De re metallica
 Fire-setting
 Freeminer
 Geordie lamp
 Gold rush
 History of coal mining
 Hurrying
 Hushing
 Mining innovations during the Industrial Revolution
 School of mines

Economics of mining 
 List of mining companies

Future of mining 
 Biomining
 Asteroid mining

People associated with mining
 miner, is a person who is involved in the act of mining
 prospector, a person who is expert in searching for and assessing the value of

Mining scholars 
 Georg Agricola - author of De re metallica
 Harrison Schmitt - American geologist, astronaut, retired senator
 Paul Worsey
 Richard Redmayne
 Robert Hunt (scientist)
 Ronald F. Tylecote
 Russell Walter Fox
 Frank T. M. White

Organizations
 National Institute for Occupational Safety and Health
 National Mining Hall of Fame, in the United States

Leaders and innovators in mining 
 Archimedes – invented the Archimedes' screw
 Charles Steen
 Daniel Guggenheim
 Ed Schieffelin
 George Stephenson – inventor of the Geordie lamp
 Henry Beecher Dierdorff – American inventor of mining equipment
 Herbert Hoover, engineer and writer on mining engineering (later President of the United States)
 Horace Austin Warner Tabor
 Humphry Davy – inventor of the Davy lamp
 Meyer Guggenheim
 Paddy Martinez
 William Boyce Thompson
 William Reid Clanny – inventor of the first safety lamp

See also 

 Billy Elliot
 Brassed Off
 Centre for Mined Land Rehabilitation
 European Route of Industrial Heritage
 Environmental impact of mining
 Mining
 National Coal Mining Museum for England
 National Mining Hall of Fame
 Salt-concrete
 Scientific drilling
 Well drilling
 Water mining
 Automated mining

External links 

 Mining Journal
 Introduction to Mining
 What is mining?

Mining
Mining